The Park City Film Music Festival is a film festival with a special emphasis on film music, which takes place annually in Park City, Utah, United States, and showcases American and International films. It was founded in 2004 and awards films with a stress on the film music. Films are screened at the Egyptian Theatre and other venues in Park City. In addition to screening films, the festival hosts as well as seminars and workshops about film music. Lectures were given e.g. by Hummie Mann, who composed the soundtrack to Robin Hood: Men in Tights. It's considered the only film festival in the USA that puts a focus on and awards film music.

References

External links 
 Official Website: Park City Film Music Festival
 Official Facebook-Site of the festival
 IMDB-page of the festival.

Film festivals in Utah